Hugh Byrne (born 3 September 1943) is a former Irish Fianna Fáil politician. He was a Teachta Dála (TD) for the Wexford constituency for a total of 18 years, and a Senator for three years.

Born in Gusserane, County Wexford, Byrne was first elected to Dáil Éireann at the 1981 general election for the Wexford constituency. He lost his seat at the 1989 general election but was nominated by the Taoiseach to the 19th Seanad. He regained his Dáil seat at the subsequent 1992 election and retained it until again losing it at the 2002 general election to party colleague Tony Dempsey. From 1997 to 2002 Byrne was a Minister of State for Marine and Natural Resources.

He played Gaelic football for the Wexford county team and hurling for the Kildare county team.

References

1943 births
Living people
Dual players
Local councillors in County Wexford
Fianna Fáil TDs
Irish farmers
Irish sportsperson-politicians
Kildare inter-county hurlers
Members of the 22nd Dáil
Members of the 23rd Dáil
Members of the 24th Dáil
Members of the 25th Dáil
Members of the 19th Seanad
Members of the 27th Dáil
Members of the 28th Dáil
Ministers of State of the 28th Dáil
Wexford inter-county Gaelic footballers
Nominated members of Seanad Éireann
Fianna Fáil senators